George Ferguson was a Scottish football player during the 1940s and 1950s.  He started his career with junior side St Anthonys before signing professionally with Celtic.  After failing to hold down a regular spot in the Celtic team, he transferred to Dumbarton where he played with distinction, being a constant in the defence for six seasons.

References 

Scottish footballers
Dumbarton F.C. players
Celtic F.C. players
Scottish Football League players
Possibly living people
Association football fullbacks
Year of birth missing